John D. Howard is CEO of Irving Place Capital (formerly Bear Stearns Merchant Banking) and was senior managing director of Bear Stearns. He is the manager of the $3 billion Bear Stearns Merchant Banking Fund III. Howard has more than 20 years of experience in the private equity business.

Prior to joining Bear Stearns in 1997 to found Bear Stearns Merchant Banking, Howard was co-chief executive officer of Vestar Capital Partners, a private equity firm specializing in management buyouts. From 1985 to 1990, he was a senior vice president and partner of Wesray Capital Corporation, one of the foremost private equity sponsors and a pioneer in the leveraged buyout business.

Howard is a director of Aearo Corporation, Aeropostale, Balducci's, Integrated Circuit Systems, New York & Company, and The Vitamin Shoppe. He has also been on the board of directors and executive committees of many firms, including Avis, Electrolux Corporation, and Wilson Sporting Goods.

Howard holds an MBA from Yale School of Management and a BA from Trinity College.

Howard is an avid tennis player, well known for his “Larry” backhand and is 5’10” 185lbs.

References
John D. Howard bio at Yale

American corporate directors
American money managers
Bear Stearns
Living people
Private equity and venture capital investors
Trinity College (Connecticut) alumni
Yale School of Management alumni
American chief executives of financial services companies
Year of birth missing (living people)